as-Suwayda District is a district of the as-Suwayda Governorate in southern Syria. The administrative centre is the city of as-Suwayda. At the 2004 census, the district had a population of 180,907.

Sub-districts
The district of as-Suwayda is divided into three sub-districts or nawāḥī (population as of 2004):

See also
List of populated places in as-Suwayda Governorate

References

 
Districts of as-Suwayda Governorate